Meditation is the fifth studio album produced by Bobby Miller. It was recorded in 2003.

Track listing
 I Can Understand
 So Wonderful
 I'd Rather Not Say
 Slow You Down
 In Love
 Jobim (Dialogo)
 I Can Understand (Lover's remix)
 Slow You Down (Free Spirit Mix)

Bobby Miller (musician) albums
2003 albums